Platinum blonde is a color of blonde hair.

Platinum Blonde may also refer to:
 Platinum Blonde (band), a Canadian new wave music band, popular in the 1980s  
 Platinum Blonde (EP), their 1983 debut EP
 Platinum Blonde (film), a 1931 film starring Jean Harlow
 "Platinum Blonde" (song), song by Blondie
 "Platinum Blonde", instrumental by Supergroove, released in the 1994 album Great Mixes
 Platinum Blonde (cocktail), an infused cocktail made of vodka

See also
 "Platinum Blonde Life", a song by No Doubt from Rock Steady
 Platinum (disambiguation)
 Blonde (disambiguation)
 Blond (disambiguation)